George Howard "Buck" Redfern (April 7, 1902 – September 8, 1964) was an infielder in Major League Baseball. He played for the Chicago White Sox.

Redfern attended North Carolina State College (now North Carolina State University), where he played college baseball for the Wolfpack.

References

External links

1902 births
1964 deaths
Major League Baseball infielders
Chicago White Sox players
NC State Wolfpack baseball players
Baseball players from North Carolina
Sportspeople from Asheville, North Carolina
Nashville Vols players